Aphyle margaritaceus is a species of moth in the family Erebidae. first described by Francis Walker in 1855. It found in French Guiana, Suriname, Peru and the Brazilian states of Amazonas and Pará.

References

Moths described in 1855
Phaegopterina
Moths of South America